Zdravko Minchev Dimitrov (born 24 August 1998) is a Bulgarian professional footballer who plays as a left winger for Turkish club Sakaryaspor, on loan from Levski Sofia.

Career
In July 2017, Dimitrov was loaned to Botev Vratsa. He was named on the bench for three Botev's games in the Second League, but he did not make an appearance in either match. He was recalled by his parent club after spending a month in Vratsa.

On 3 September 2017, Dimitrov joined Lokomotiv Sofia on loan until the end of the season.

Levski Sofia
He became part of Levski Sofia in the summer of 2019. He made his debut on 11th of June in the Europa League qualification win against Ružomberok substituting Iliya Yurukov in the 89th minute. He scored his first goal for Levski on 14th of February 2021 in the 2-0 win against Montana. Receiving good pass from Nigel Robertha, dribbling past one opposite defender he netted the first goal of the game in the 14th minute. Upon the return of Stanimir Stoilov as head coach of Levski in September 2021, Dimitrov was sidelined on his position as left-winger by new signing Welton. In March 2022, Dimitrov along with fellow team-mate Dimitar Kostadinov were excluded from the squad by manager Stoilov due to disciplinary issues, later identified as gambling addiction.

Spartak Varna
Six months after Dimitrov's suspension from the first team squad of Levski, the player joined newly promoted side Spartak Varna on a one-year loan deal.

International career
Dimitrov made his debut for the Bulgarian under-21 team on 22 March 2019 in the starting eleven for the friendly against Northern Ireland U21. He netted his first goal on 13 October 2020, opening the scoring in the 1:1 away draw with Poland U21. Dimitrov earned his first cap for the  senior national team on 11 November 2020, coming on as a substitute for Georgi Yomov during the second half of the 3:0 win over Gibraltar in a friendly match.

Honours

Club
Levski Sofia
 Bulgarian Cup (1): 2021–22

Career statistics

Club

References

External links

Profile at LevskiSofia.info

Living people
1998 births
Bulgarian footballers
Bulgaria youth international footballers
Bulgaria under-21 international footballers
Bulgaria international footballers
Association football midfielders
FC Septemvri Sofia players
FC Botev Vratsa players
FC Lokomotiv 1929 Sofia players
PFC Levski Sofia players
PFC Spartak Varna players
First Professional Football League (Bulgaria) players